WZVN (107.1 FM, "Z-107.1") is an American radio station broadcasting an adult contemporary music format. Licensed to Lowell, Indiana, United States, it serves Northwest Indiana and Chicago's south suburbs.  The station is currently owned by Adams Radio Group, LLC, through licensee Adams Radio of Northern Indiana, LLC. The station also features national and local newscasts. The WZVN tower is located on Indiana State Road 55 just north of Indiana State Road 2.

History
The station began broadcasting on November 24, 1972, and held the call sign WLCL-FM, which stood for Lowell and Cedar Lake. WLCL was owned by William J. Dunn and aired a full service format, with an assortment of community programming and local news.

In 1981, the station was sold to White Advertising Metro for $250,000. Later that year, its call letters were changed to WZVN. The community programming was phased out and the station aired an adult contemporary format, as "Z-107".

In 1987, the station was sold to Gracol Broadcasting, making WZVN a sister station of AM 1230 WJOB. In 1996, WZVN and WJOB were sold to M&M Broadcasting, a firm led by former Hammond, Indiana, mayor Thomas McDermott, Sr., for $5.3 million. In 2004, the station was sold to Radio One Communications, along with 103.9 WXRD, for $4.9 million. The station was purchased by Adams Radio Group in 2014.

WZVN is a member of the Indiana Broadcasters Association.

References

External links
Official website
Adams Radio Group Website

ZVN
Mainstream adult contemporary radio stations in the United States
Radio stations established in 1972
1972 establishments in Indiana
Mass media in Lake County, Indiana